Abraham David Sofaer (born May 6, 1938) is an American attorney and jurist who served as a United States district judge of the United States District Court for the Southern District of New York and legal adviser to the United States State Department. After resigning from the State Department, he became the George P. Shultz Senior Fellow in Foreign Policy and National Security Affairs at the Hoover Institution.

Early life and education

Born on May 6, 1938, in Bombay (now Mumbai), India, Sofaer received a Bachelor of Arts degree in 1962 (magna cum laude in American history) from Yeshiva University and a Bachelor of Laws from New York University School of Law in 1965, where he was editor-in-chief of the New York University Law Review.

Career 
After law school, Sofaer served as law clerk to Judge J. Skelly Wright of the United States Court of Appeals for the District of Columbia Circuit (1965–66), and for Justice William J. Brennan Jr. of the United States Supreme Court (1966 to 1967). From 1967 to 1969, he was an assistant United States attorney in the Southern District of New York under Robert Morgenthau. His work focused on the use by Americans of foreign banks and other financial institutions to violate U.S. laws. From 1969 to 1979, Sofaer was a professor of law at Columbia University School of Law, during which time he wrote War, Foreign Affairs, and Constitutional Power, an authoritative historical account of the constitutional powers of Congress and the president to control or affect issues related to the international use of force. As a New York state administrative judge from 1975 to 1976, he handled the first major environmental action involving PCBs, specifically their discharge by General Electric into the Hudson River. After issuing an opinion holding GE liable despite its having been issue with a license, Sofaer worked with Peter Berle, then head of New York State Department of Environmental Conservation, Sarah Chassis, lead attorney for the Natural Resources Defense Council, and Jack Welch, then VP at GE to settle the case in an agreement joined by 17 environmental organizations. This work led to Sofaer being recommended to a committee established by Senator Daniel Patrick Moynihan (chaired by former White House Counsel Leonard Garment) to screen candidates for the federal district courts in New York state.

Federal judicial service 
Per the recommendation of United States Senator Daniel Patrick Moynihan, Sofaer was nominated by President Jimmy Carter on January 19, 1979, to a seat on the United States District Court for the Southern District of New York vacated by Judge Marvin E. Frankel. He was confirmed by the United States Senate on March 21, 1979, and received his commission on March 23, 1979. His service terminated on June 9, 1985, due to resignation.

State Department 
On June 9, 1985, then-Secretary of State George Shultz asked Sofaer to become legal adviser of the Department of State, a position in which he served until 1990. According to his Hoover Institution biography, Sofaer "was principal negotiator in various interstate matters that were successfully resolved, including the dispute between Egypt and Israel over Taba, the claim against Iraq for its attack on the USS Stark, and the claims against Chile for the assassination of diplomat Orlando Letelier. He received the Distinguished Service Award in 1989, the highest State Department award given to a non-civil servant." He assisted Shultz in forcing disclosures that led to the termination of arms dealings with Iran as part of the Iran Contra scandal. See his description of these activities at http://www.abesofaer.com.

Return to private practice 
After leaving the Department of State, Sofaer practiced law at Hughes Hubbard & Reed in Washington, D.C., from 1990 to 1994. He represented the World Wide Fund for Nature in its successful effort to establish a memorandum of understanding (MOU) for the management and sharing of authority within what remains the world’s most influential environmental organization. The WWF was represented by Lloyd Cutler. During this period, he began acting as an arbitrator in major international and domestic disputes. He agreed during this period to assist Libya in attempting to satisfy the United Nations Security Council resolutions issued against it concerning the Pan Am Flight 103 bombing. He worked out a plan with Libyan officials including a trial of the suspects in The Hague and compensation to the families before accepting the assignment. After publicly obtaining a license for the work, however, Sofaer was attacked by some family members of the victims and criticized by U.S. officials opposed to any such negotiation. He withdrew from the representation as he concluded he could not be effective in implementing the agreed plan while defending himself. Nonetheless, Sofaer was subject to a grand jury investigation into whether he had made false statements in applying for the license from the Office of Foreign Assets Control to represent Libya. The investigation was terminated without any action against him, but the District of Columbia Bar found that Sofaer should be "informally admonished" for taking on the representation, on the ground that the U.S. government investigation of the bombing was a "matter" under the Code of Ethics, like a litigation or appeal, and even though Libya was not even a suspect at the time Sofaer left the Department. The plan Sofaer developed was ultimately agreed and implemented by the U.S., the Council, and Libya.

In 1994, Sofaer was appointed George P. Shultz Senior Fellow in Foreign Policy and National Security Affairs at the Hoover Institution. His "work has focused on separation of powers issues in the American system of government, including the power over war, and on issues related to international law, terrorism, diplomacy, national security, the Middle East conflict, and water resources.” For several years, he taught a course on transnational law at the Stanford Law School, and is currently scheduled to teach arbitration. At Hoover he has published many op-eds, articles, chapters in books, and two books on international security issues: “The Best Defense?: Legitimacy and Preventive Force; Taking on Iran: Strength, Diplomacy & The Iranian Threat (Hoover 2013)."

Non-profit work 
Sofaer is a founding member and former chairman of the National Jazz Museum in Harlem. He currently serves on its Board as Vice-Chair. He is a trustee of the Koret Foundation of San Francisco, a fellow of the Israel Museum, and a member of the International Advisory Boards of the Israel Democracy Institute and NGO Monitor.

Personal life

Sofaer's father was a cousin of the actor Abraham Sofaer. Their fathers Meyer and Isaac were born in Rangoon, Burma, the descendants of Jewish immigrants from Baghdad, Iraq. They built a trading business in Rangoon, the evidence of which can still be seen in the form of Sofaer’s Building, a large office and retail center which the city is attempting to restore along with other colonial era buildings.

Publications

Articles included  "Taking The War To The Terrorists" in Forbes (10/08),  "War of resources" about Hezbollah (8/06), and an online debate,  "Should Dictators Be Put to Death?" with Kenneth Roth of Human Rights Watch, on the Council on Foreign Relations Web site (6/06).

See also
 George H. W. Bush Supreme Court candidates#Names frequently mentioned
 List of law clerks of the Supreme Court of the United States (Seat 3)

References

Sources

External links
 Abraham D. Sofaer – George P. Shultz Senior Fellow, Hoover Institution, Stanford University
 
 Abraham D. Sofaer, Personal Website

Additional publication
War, Foreign Affairs, and Constitutional Power, historical account of the constitutional powers of Congress and the president to control or affect the use of force.

1938 births
Living people
Assistant United States Attorneys
Indian emigrants to the United States
Judges of the United States District Court for the Southern District of New York
Law clerks of the Supreme Court of the United States
New York University alumni
Scholars from Mumbai
United States district court judges appointed by Jimmy Carter
20th-century American judges
Yeshiva University alumni
American politicians of Indian descent
Columbia University faculty
Asian conservatism in the United States